"Commitment" is a song written by Tony Colton, Tony Marty and Bobby Wood, and recorded by American country music artist LeAnn Rimes. It was released in April 1998 as the lead single from her album Sittin' on Top of the World. The song placed at number 4 on the US country charts, number 38 in the UK. It was later featured on Rimes' Greatest Hits and its international version, The Best of LeAnn Rimes.

Track listing
US single
 "Looking Through Your Eyes" – 4:07
 "Commitment" – 4:36

Charts

Weekly charts

Year-end charts

References

1998 songs
1998 singles
LeAnn Rimes songs
Curb Records singles
Songs written by Tony Colton
Songs written by Bobby Wood (songwriter)